Polygonatum multiflorum, the Solomon's seal, David's harp, ladder-to-heaven or Eurasian Solomon's seal, is a species of flowering plant in the family Asparagaceae, native to Europe and temperate Asia. In Britain it is one of three native species of the genus, the others being P. odoratum and P. verticillatum.

It is valued in cultivation for its ability to colonise shady areas, and is suitable for a woodland style planting.

The specific epithet multiflorum means "many-flowered".

The hybrid Polygonatum × hybridum (P. multiflorum × P. odoratum) has gained the Royal Horticultural Society's Award of Garden Merit.

References

Matthew Wood. The Book of Herbal Wisdom. Random House, 1997. ; pp. 397–408

External links

multiflorum
Flora of Europe
Flora of temperate Asia
Garden plants of Asia
Garden plants of Europe